Metalectra richardsi, or Richards' fungus moth, is a species of moth in the family Erebidae. The species was described by Auburn Edmond Brower in 1941. It is found in North America.

The MONA or Hodges number for Metalectra richardsi is 8505.

References

Further reading
 Lafontaine, J. Donald, & Schmidt, B. Christian (2010). "Annotated check list of the Noctuoidea (Insecta, Lepidoptera) of North America north of Mexico". ZooKeys. vol. 40, 1-239.

External links
Butterflies and Moths of North America
NCBI Taxonomy Browser, Metalectra richardsi

Moths described in 1941